Jacques Leloup (born 28 April 1952) is a Belgian former butterfly swimmer. He competed in two events at the 1972 Summer Olympics.

References

External links
 

1952 births
Living people
Belgian male butterfly swimmers
Olympic swimmers of Belgium
Swimmers at the 1972 Summer Olympics
Sportspeople from Liège